is a Japanese manga series written and illustrated by Yu Imai. It was first published as three one-shot-chapters in Kodansha's seinen manga magazine Weekly Young Magazine in 2010 and continued as a serialized manga in Monthly Young Magazine from January 2011 to January 2014.

Publication
Written and illustrated by Yu Imai, Imori 201 was first as three one-shot-chapters in Kodansha's seinen manga magazine Weekly Young Magazine from November 22 to December 6, 2010. It was later serialized in Monthly Young Magazine; the frist part was published from January 12 to May 5, 2011. Another one-shot chapter was published in Weekly Young Magazine on September 26, 2011, and the second part was published in Monthly Young Magazine from October 12, 2011, to January 8, 2014. Kodansha collected its chapters in five tankōbon volumes, released from July 6, 2011, to March 6, 2014.

Volume list

See also
The Witches of Adamas, another manga series by the same author

References

External links
 

Kodansha manga
Romantic comedy anime and manga
Seinen manga